Robert Judson Evans (December 27, 1910 – October 15, 1947) was an American Negro league pitcher in the 1930s and 1940s.

A native of Richmond, Virginia, Evans made his Negro leagues debut in 1932 with the Washington Pilots. He went on to play for several teams, including the Newark Eagles and New York Black Yankees. Evans died in Richmond in 1947 at age 36.

References

External links
 and Seamheads

1910 births
1947 deaths
New York Black Yankees players
Newark Dodgers players
Newark Eagles players
Philadelphia Stars players
Washington Pilots players
20th-century African-American sportspeople
Baseball pitchers